Alfredo Evangelista (born December 3, 1954) is a Uruguayan-born former boxer. He was born in Montevideo, Uruguay. 

"The Lynx of Montevideo" Evangelista faced Muhammad Ali in a bout for the world heavyweight championship in 1977, losing by unanimous decision in 15 rounds. He also fought against Larry Holmes for the world heavyweight championship  in 1978, and lost by knockout in the seventh round. He notably defeated title challenger Renaldo Snipes.

Boxing career 
Evangelista was a good boxer who went undefeated in his first fifteen matches. One of those was a draw but the rest were wins. For his sixteenth fight he was defeated by European Champion Lorenzo Zanon, and after the fight faced Muhammad Ali in a bout for the world heavyweight championship in 1977, losing by unanimous decision in 15 rounds.

After these fights he had nine straight victories. He then fought against Larry Holmes for the World Boxing Council title in 1978, and lost by knockout in the seventh round. Evangelista followed this up by three wins and a loss to Lorenzo Zanon in their rematch. He drew with Felipe Rodriguez and moved on.

He won seven fights before meeting and losing to Leon Spinks, who had beaten Muhammad Ali. He won six more, then drew with Felipe in their second fight. He took two wins before getting bested by Greg Page. Evangelista had a six-fight streak of no losses, with five wins and one draw piled in there. This streak ended at the hands of Lucien Rodriguez. He won four fights until Hughroy Currie overcame him. Evangelista then had a win streak of eight before getting beaten by Steffen Tangstad. Patrick Lumumba bested him after Evangelista pulled off two more wins. He won a fight before three straight losses, and after another win retired.

His career was generally streaks of wins followed by a loss. Sometimes he had two or three losses in a row. His record was decent, with many wins, but ultimately contained more losses to middling fighters than to great opponents. This makes it nearly impossible to list him as an all-time great himself, but he was certainly a good, skilled boxer.

Professional boxing record

{|class="wikitable" style="text-align:center; font-size:95%"
|-
!Result
!class="unsortable" width="60pt"| Record
!Opponent
!Type
!Round, time
!Date
!Location
!Notes
|-align=center
|Win
|62–13–4
|align=left| Arthur Wright
|KO
|2
|15/04/1988
|align=left| Madrid
|
|-
|Loss
|61–13–4
|align=left| Adilson Rodrigues
|PTS
|10
|20/12/1987
|align=left| Rio de Janeiro
|
|-
|Loss
|61–12–4
|align=left| Pierre Coetzer
|PTS
|10
|30/08/1987
|align=left| Ellis Park Stadium, Johannesburg, South Africa
|align=left|
|-
|Loss
|61–11–4
|align=left| Anders Eklund
|KO
|7
|28/03/1987
|align=left| K.B. Hallen, Copenhagen
|align=left|
|-
|Win
|61–10–4
|align=left| Andre van den Oetelaar
|TKO
|5
|08/01/1987
|align=left| Bilbao
|align=left|
|-
|Loss
|60–10–4
|align=left| Patrick Lumumba
|PTS
|8
|05/09/1986
|align=left| Madrid
|align=left|
|-
|Win
|60–9–4
|align=left| Tim Miller
|KO
|4
|25/04/1986
|align=left| Benavente, Zamora
|align=left|
|-
|Win
|59–9–4
|align=left| Frank Vega
|KO
|1
|15/03/1986
|align=left| Santa Cruz de Tenerife
|align=left|
|-
|Loss
|58–9–4
|align=left| Steffen Tangstad
|PTS
|8
|10/01/1986
|align=left| Randers Hallen, Randers
|align=left|
|-
|Win
|58–8–4
|align=left| Louis Pergaud Ngatchou
|PTS
|8
|19/11/1985
|align=left| Barcelona
|align=left|
|-
|Win
|57–8–4
|align=left| James Dixon
|SD
|10
|07/07/1985
|align=left| Riviera Las Vegas, Las Vegas
|align=left|
|-
|Win
|56–8–4
|align=left| Marty Capasso
|PTS
|10
|07/06/1985
|align=left| Oranjestad, Aruba
|align=left|
|-
|Win
|55–8–4
|align=left| Tony Velasco
|DQ
|5
|10/05/1985
|align=left| Galt Ocean Mile Hotel, Fort Lauderdale, Florida
|align=left|
|-
|Win
|54–8–4
|align=left| Tim Miller
|TKO
|3
|03/29/1985
|align=left| Nassau, Bahamas
|align=left|
|-
|Win
|53–8–4
|align=left| Sterling Benjamin
|TKO
|9
|01/03/1985
|align=left| Jean Pierre Sports Complex, Port of Spain
|align=left|
|-
|Win
|52–8–4
|align=left| Arthur Wright
|TKO
|2
|05/01/1985
|align=left| Badajoz
|align=left|
|-
|Win
|51–8–4
|align=left| Louis Persaud Ngatchou
|PTS
|8
|13/07/1984
|align=left| Palma de Mallorca
|align=left|
|-
|Loss
|50–8–4
|align=left| Hughroy Currie
|PTS
|8
|06/04/1984
|align=left| Bilbao
|align=left|
|-
|Win
|50–7–4
|align=left| Renaldo Snipes
|SD
|10
|23/09/1983
|align=left| Richfield Coliseum, Richfield, Ohio
|align=left|
|-
|Win
|49–7–4
|align=left| Larry Ware
|KO
|2
|17/07/1983
|align=left| The Dunes, Las Vegas
|align=left|
|-
|Win
|48–7–4
|align=left| Victor Varon
|PTS
|8
|19/12/1982
|align=left| Salamanca
|align=left|
|-
|Win
|47-7–4
|align=left| Victor Varon
|PTS
|8
|28/08/1982
|align=left| Puente Genil
|align=left|
|-
|Loss
|46-7–4
|align=left| Lucien Rodriguez
|PTS
|12
|07/06/1982
|align=left| Paris
|align=left|
|-
|Win
|46–6–4
|align=left| Ali Lukasa
|TKO
|6
|29/04/1982
|align=left| Barcelona
|align=left|
|-
|Draw
|45–6–4
|align=left| Terry O'Connor
|PTS
|8
|23/10/1981
|align=left| Madrid
|align=left|
|-
|Win
|45–6–3
|align=left| Terry Mintus
|KO
|3
|12/09/1981
|align=left| Oviedo
|align=left|
|-
|Win
|44–6–3
|align=left| Terry Daniels
|KO
|2
|29/08/1981
|align=left| Ibiza
|align=left|
|-
|Win
|43–6–3
|align=left| Tom Prater
|RTD
|4
|01/08/1981
|align=left| La Linea de la Concepción
|align=left|
|-
|Win
|42–6–3
|align=left| Mary Konate
|KO
|3
|18/07/1981
|align=left| Pontevedra
|align=left|
|-
|Loss
|41–6–3
|align=left| Greg Page
|KO
|2
|12/06/1981
|align=left| Joe Louis Arena, Detroit
|align=left|
|-
|Win
|41-5–3
|align=left| Henry Patterson
|KO
|1
|09/05/1981
|align=left| Guadalajara, Castile-La Mancha
|align=left|
|-
|Win
|40–5–3
|align=left| Henry Patterson
|PTS
|8
|21/03/1981
|align=left| Zaragoza
|align=left|
|-
|Draw
|39–5–3
|align=left| Felipe Rodriquez Piñeiro
|PTS
|10
|02/01/1981
|align=left| Palma de Mallorca
|align=left|
|-
|Win
|39–5–2
|align=left| Johnny Blaine
|TKO
|4
|13/09/1980
|align=left| Málaga
|align=left|
|-
|Win
|38–5–2
|align=left| Bob Stallings
|DQ
|6
|01/08/1980
|align=left| Palma de Mallorca
|align=left|
|-
|Win
|37–5–2
|align=left| Neil Malpass
|PTS
|8
|17/07/1980
|align=left| Barcelona
|align=left|
|-
|Win
|36–5–2
|align=left| Winston Allen
|PTS
|8
|21/06/1980
|align=left| Barcelona
|align=left|
|-
|Win
|35–5–2
|align=left| Tommy Kiely
|PTS
|8
|09/05/1980
|align=left| Barcelona
|align=left|
|-
|Win
|34–5–2
|align=left|Fetiche Kassongo
|TKO
|3
|07/03/1980
|align=left| Barcelona
|align=left|
|-
|Loss
|33–5–2
|align=left| Leon Spinks
|KO
|5
|12/01/1980
|align=left| Resorts Casino Hotel, Atlantic City, New Jersey
|align=left|
|-
|Win
|33–4–2
|align=left| Tony Moore
|PTS
|8
|08/12/1979
|align=left| A Coruña
|align=left|
|-
|Win
|32–4–2
|align=left| Calvin Langston
|TKO
|3
|01/12/1979
|align=left| Pamplona
|align=left|
|-
|Win
|31–4–2
|align=left| Jacob Tchanthuing
|RTD
|2
|08/11/1979
|align=left| Bilbao
|align=left|
|-
|Win
|30-4–2
|align=left| Tony Moore
|PTS
|8
|27/10/1979
|align=left| A Coruña
|align=left|
|-
|Win
|29–4–2
|align=left| Elliott Bryant
|TKO
|3
|04/08/1979
|align=left| Vigo
|align=left|
|-
|Win
|28–4–2
|align=left| Dan Ronnell Johnson
|RTD
|2
|27/07/1979
|align=left| Santander, Cantabria
|align=left|
|-
|Win
|27–4–2
|align=left| Johnny Blaine
|TKO
|2
|21/07/1979
|align=left| Logroño
|align=left|
|-
|Draw
|26–4–2
|align=left| Felipe Rodriquez Piñeiro
|PTS
|10
|14/07/1979
|align=left| Pontevedra
|align=left|
|-
|Loss
|26-4–1
|align=left| Lorenzo Zanon
|PTS
|12
|18/04/1979
|align=left| Turin
|align=left|
|-
|Win
|26–3–1
|align=left| Guillermo de la Cruz
|KO
|4
|18/03/1979
|align=left| Valencia
|align=left|
|-
|Win
|25–3–1
|align=left| Lucien Rodriguez
|KO
|2
|02/03/1979
|align=left| Liege
|align=left|
|-
|Win
|24–3–1
|align=left| Dante Cane
|KO
|4
|26/12/1978
|align=left| Bologna
|align=left|
|-
|Loss
|23–3–1
|align=left| Larry Holmes
|KO
|7
|10/11/1978
|align=left| Caesars Palace, Las Vegas, Nevada
|align=left|
|-
|Win
|23–2–1
|align=left| Joe Maye
|KO
|3
|09/09/1978
|align=left| A Coruña
|align=left|
|-
|Win
|22–2–1
|align=left| Jacob Tchanthuing
|KO
|8
|11/08/1978
|align=left| Lepe
|align=left|
|-
|Win
|21–2–1
|align=left| Jody Ballard
|SD
|10
|09/06/1978
|align=left| Caesars Palace, Las Vegas, Nevada
|align=left|
|-
|Win
|20–2–1
|align=left| Billy Joiner
|KO
|1
|27/05/1978
|align=left| Leon, Spain
|align=left|
|-
|Win
|19–2–1
|align=left| Billy Aird
|PTS
|15
|03/03/1978
|align=left| Leon, Spain
|align=left|
|-
|Win
|18–2–1
|align=left| Jean-Pierre Coopman
|KO
|1
|26/11/1977
|align=left| Brussels
|align=left|
|-
|Win
|17–2–1
|align=left| Pedro Soto
|TKO
|8
|29/09/1977
|align=left| Madison Square Garden, New York City
|align=left|
|-
|Win
|16–2–1
|align=left| Lucien Rodriguez
|TKO
|11
|09/09/1977
|align=left| Madrid
|align=left|
|-€€
|Win
|15–2–1
|align=left| Christian Poncelet
|TKO
|3
|17/06/1977
|align=left| Madrid
|align=left|
|-
|Loss
|14–2–1
|align=left| Muhammad Ali
|UD
|15
|16/05/1977
|align=left| Capitol Centre, Landover, Maryland
|align=left|
|-
|Loss
|14–1–1
|align=left| Lorenzo Zanon
|PTS
|8
|04/02/1977
|align=left| Bilbao
|align=left|
|-
|Win
|14–0–1
|align=left| Guillermo De la Cruz
|TKO
|6
|03/12/1976
|align=left| Montevideo
|align=left|
|-
|Win
|13–0–1
|align=left| Lisimo Obutobe
|TKO
|5
|19/11/1976
|align=left| Madrid
|align=left|
|-
|Win
|12–0–1
|align=left| Rudi Lubbers
|TKO
|3
|08/10/1976
|align=left| Madrid Sports Palace, Madrid
|align=left|
|-
|Win
|11–0–1
|align=left| Fermin Hernandez
|KO
|4
|07/08/1976
|align=left| Santa Cruz de Tenerife
|align=left|
|-
|Win
|10–0–1
|align=left| Tony Moore
|PTS
|8
|21/07/1976
|align=left| Bilbao
|align=left|
|-
|Win
|9–0–1
|align=left| Mario Baruzzi
|TKO
|4
|02/07/1976
|align=left| Barcelona
|align=left|
|-
|Win
|8–0–1
|align=left| Lucien Rodriguez
|TKO
|4
|02/06/1976
|align=left| Bilbao
|align=left|
|-
|Win
|7–0–1
|align=left| Jose Manuel Urtain
|RTD
|5
|14/05/1976
|align=left| Madrid
|align=left|
|-
|Win
|6–0–1
|align=left| Benito Penna
|RTD
|2
|23/04/1976
|align=left| Madrid
|align=left|
|-
|Win
|5–0–1
|align=left| Giuseppe Ros
|PTS
|8
|02/04/1976
|align=left| Madrid
|align=left|
|-
|Win
|4–0–1
|align=left| Neville Meade
|PTS
|8
|12/03/1976
|align=left| Madrid
|align=left|
|-
|Draw
|3–0–1
|align=left| Jose Antonio Galvez
|PTS
|8
|21/02/1976
|align=left| Almeria
|align=left|
|-
|Win
|3–0
|align=left| Adriano Rosati
|KO
|3
|29/01/1976
|align=left| Bilbao
|align=left|
|-
|Win
|2–0
|align=left| Santiago Alberto Lovell
|KO
|2
|25/12/1975
|align=left| Bilbao
|align=left|
|-
|Win
|1–0
|align=left| Angelo Visini
|TKO
|1
|10/10/1975
|align=left| Madrid
|align=left|

References

External links

1954 births
Heavyweight boxers
Living people
Sportspeople from Montevideo
Uruguayan sportspeople of Italian descent
Uruguayan people of Spanish descent
Uruguayan male boxers
European Boxing Union champions
Spanish male boxers